The Herbert Wertheim College of Engineering is the largest professional school, the second largest college, and one of the top three research units at the University of Florida. The college was founded in 1910, and in 2015 was named in honor of Herbert Wertheim – a serial inventor, philanthropist and UF Distinguished Alumnus. Located on the university's Gainesville, Florida campus, the college is composed of nine departments, 15 degree programs, and more than 20 centers and institutes. It produces research and graduates in more than a dozen fields of engineering and science including: aerospace, agricultural, biological, biomedical, chemical, civil, coastal, computer, computer science, digital arts, electrical, environmental, industrial, materials, mechanical, nuclear, and systems.

History
The College of Engineering was founded in 1910. Dean John R. Benton led five faculty members who taught 48 students a curriculum of civil, mechanical and electrical engineering. The first engineering building, later named Benton Hall, was finished in 1911.

The purpose of the college was to "prepare young men for useful careers by training engineers and technical employees." The college's first graduating class consisted of five men. By 1915, the college had 35 graduates, 23 being employed in engineering, mostly in the state of Florida.

In 1918, most university activities were subordinated to activities supporting the World War I effort. The college was home to U.S. Army training school work and a war-measures school for radio operators. Following the war, enrollment increased. The 1920 freshman class exceeded 300 men — almost twice the size of the previous year, and the university began charging tuition fees. For $245 annually, engineering students could earn a Bachelor of Science degree in civil engineering, electrical engineering, mechanical engineering or chemical engineering.

In 1941, war again spurred rapid growth in the college's research programs with the establishment of the Engineering and Industrial Experiment Station (EIES), which contributed substantial support for World War II efforts. The college had secret contracts with the Office of Scientific Research and Development, the U.S. Signal Corps, the National Bureau of Standards and other agencies totaling more than a half million dollars. After the war, reports revealed that the college's contribution "would make an enviable chapter in the history of any institution." EIES later focused on preserving Florida's natural environment.

Enrollment increased rapidly during the postwar period. In 1950, the Engineering and Industries building (now Weil Hall) was built to accommodate the need for more space. At that time, Weil Hall housed the entire college. In the 1950s, the University of Florida began enrolling women, and in 1955, the first woman graduated from the college with a master's degree in chemical engineering. In 1957, nuclear engineering was established as a department, and in 1959, the university's 10,000-watt nuclear training reactor became Florida's first critical reactor.

Always in need of more space, the college in 1964 began construction on the South Complex, with buildings for electrical, aerospace, chemical and environmental engineering, and the North Complex, with buildings to house mechanical and materials engineering. In 1967, the departments moved into their buildings.

The 1970s were a turbulent time. Due to increased sensitivity about the natural world, many college departments focused research around environmental subjects. Environmental engineering began offering undergraduate degrees; agricultural engineering focused on water conservation and irrigation; coastal engineers were looking to stabilize Florida's coastlines; nuclear engineering was studying the feasibility of offshore power plants; and mechanical engineering became a national leader in solar energy studies.

Computers were changing the nature of research within the college. The departments of Industrial & Systems Engineering, Electrical Engineering and Computer & Information Sciences were doing advanced research in computer-related fields. This shift began with an engineer: UF alumnus John Vincent Atanasoff. In 1973, Atanasoff was credited as the originator of the modern computer. He had created a prototype of the first digital calculator in 1939, and it possessed many features of modern computers—a binary system, regenerative memory, logical schemes as elements of software and electronic components for storing data.

Multi-disciplinary biomedical engineering research was also becoming important within the college. University of Florida materials engineers developed and patented Bioglass, the first composite material that would bind securely to bone.

Engineering enrollment tripled during this era under the leadership of Dean Wayne H. Chen, who increased efforts to attract under-represented students. Research funding rose from $4 million to $30 million during his 15-year tenure, which ended in 1988.

Chen also emphasized the need for interdisciplinary research.  Several centers and institutes were founded at the University of Florida in the 1980s, including the Center for Microcomputers in Transportation; the Innovative Nuclear Space Power and Propulsion Institute; the Software Engineering Research Center; and the Center for Intelligent Machines and Robotics, the first university robotics laboratory in the United States.

Research expenditures and department growth continued under Dean Win Phillips, who is now UF's vice president for research. By 1990, the College of Engineering ranked 12th in the nation in research expenditures.

Again needing more space, groundbreaking for a $19 million New Engineering Building occurred in early 1995. The  building now houses parts of the Electrical & Computer Engineering, Environmental Engineering Sciences and Mechanical & Aerospace Engineering departments. 
The college also won a bid for a National Science Foundation Engineering Research Center during the 1994–95 academic year. The Particle Science & Technology Center conducts research in an area that represents $1 trillion to the nation's economy.

A recent research focus has been on new materials, electronics and communications. UF engineering experiments in crystal growth also rode to orbit on the space shuttle.

Computer science faculty and their students equipped the Computer Sciences and Engineering building with the first wireless computer network on campus. The college, collaborating with the College of Fine Arts, launched a popular digital arts and sciences program that focuses on defining, creating and advancing digital technology for applications in the entertainment industry, science, medicine, manufacturing and education.

A biomedical engineering degree program was approved in 1997 and quickly won a $1 million grant to support the program, reflecting the National Institute of Health's increase in biomedical engineering research.

By 1998, a third of the college's students were enrolled in computer science, computer engineering and electrical engineering majors, reflecting the impact information technology was having on engineering. In fall 2003, total enrollment in the college exceeded 6,000 students. Total research expenditures in the 1999–2000 academic year were more than $61 million and would rise to $90 million in the 2003-2004 fiscal year under the strong leadership of Dean Pramod Khargonekar, who took the helm in 2001 and stepped down in 2009.

Currently led by Dean Cammy Abernathy, the college's first female dean, today the college strongly emphasizes the importance of leadership and innovation in an engineering curriculum.

Schools and departments 
 Engineering School of Sustainable Infrastructure & Environment
 Department of Agricultural & Biological Engineering
 J. Crayton Pruitt Family Department of Biomedical Engineering
 Department of Chemical Engineering
 Department of Computer & Information Science & Engineering
 Department of Electrical & Computer Engineering
 Department of Industrial & Systems Engineering
 Department of Materials Science & Engineering
 Department of Mechanical & Aerospace Engineering

Research 
The University of Florida College of Engineering was awarded $85 million in annual research expenditures in sponsored research for 2018.

Priority areas 
Engineering research priorities listed on the college website:

Health 
 Advanced Manufacturing for Healthcare
 Engineering the Brain
 Soft Matter Engineering

Sustainability 
 Energy Systems
 Resilient Coastal Communities

Security 
 Cybersecurity
 Autonomous Systems

Enabling technologies 
 Informatics Tools and Techniques
 Bioinformatics
 Human Centered Computing

Research facilities 
 Major Analytical Instrumentation Center
 Nanoscale Research Facility
 Particle Analysis Instrumentation Center (PAIC)
 Electronic Communications Laboratory (ECL)
 UF Training Reactor

Graduate rankings according to U.S. News & World Report (2020 edition)

Undergraduate Ranking according to U.S. News & World Report (2021 edition) 
 32nd overall by the U.S. News & World Report, 2021
 7th for Biological/Agricultural Engineering
 48th for Computer Science

Student involvement
The Benton Engineering Council (BEC) was established in 1910 to serve as the executive and legislative coordinating body for the students and organizations in the College of Engineering.  There are currently 51 undergraduate and graduate student societies in the council, including many UF chapters of national organizations.

See also
 Bridge Software Institute
 Pramod Khargonekar

References

External links
College of Engineering Official website
Alligator Article about the College
About the College
Gainesville Sun info about the College
About the Distance Programs offered
Alligator article about the rankings
History and Overview of the College
Gainesville Sun Article about the College's Rankings
Benton Engineering Council

Engineering schools and colleges in the United States
Engineering universities and colleges in Florida
Engineering
Educational institutions established in 1910
1910 establishments in Florida